Vincent Feigenbutz (born 11 September 1995) is a German professional boxer. He held the WBA (Regular) super-middleweight title in 2016 and challenged for the IBF super-middleweight title in 2020.

Professional career

Feigenbutz turned pro at the age of 16, with no amateur background. After winning his first fight by knockout, Feigenbutz was stopped by way of TKO in his second bout. Feigenbutz was able to continue building his career, eventually winning the WBA interim super middleweight title against Peruvian veteran Mauricio Reynoso in July 2015.

Feigenbutz vs. De Carolis 
Later that year, Feigenbutz defended his title against Giovanni De Carolis, winning a controversial decision (115-113, 115-113, 114-113) that was widely reviled. Feigenbutz was knocked down in the first round of that bout. An immediate rematch was agreed to, for the WBA's regular championship.

Feigenbutz vs. De Carolis 
The second fight was won by De Carolis with an 11th-round TKO.

In 2017, Feigenbutz was named as a reserve for the World Boxing Super Series.

Feigenbutz vs. Nunez 
On February 15, 2020, Feigenbutz fought Cesar Nunez. Feigenbutz won the fight via eighth round TKO, after dropping Nunez twice in the round.

Feigenbutz vs. Plant 
Feigenbutz vs Plant place on March 8, 2022 and it was for Plant's IBF super middleweight belt. The fight resulted in a tenth round TKO victory for Plant.

Feigenbutz vs. Saidi 
In his next bout, Feigenbutz fought and defeated Jama Saidi via unanimous decision, 118-111, 116-112 and 116-112 on the scorecards.

Professional boxing record

References

External links

Vincent Feigenbutz - Profile, News Archive & Current Rankings at Box.Live

 
|-

|-

1995 births
Living people
German male boxers
Super-middleweight boxers
Sportspeople from Karlsruhe